Ahangaaram is a 1983 Indian Malayalam-language film, directed by D. Sasi and produced by Jose V. Mattam. The film stars M. G. Soman, Santhakumari, Ravi Menon and Prabhu. The film has musical score by Maharaja.

Cast

Jayan as Suresh
M. G. Soman as Vinod
Santhakumari as Radhika's mother
Ravi Menon as Gopi
Prabhu as Balu 
Master Suresh as Bijumon
Kaduvakulam Antony as Radhika's foster father
Aranmula Ponnamma as Sreedevi
Rajalakshmi as Radhika
Jose Prakash as Rajan
Thikkurissy Sukumaran Nair as IS Padman
Jagathy Sreekumar as Nadanam Naanu
Jayanthy as Rema

Soundtrack
The music was composed by Maharaja and the lyrics were written by Bichu Thirumala.

References

External links
 

1983 films
1980s Malayalam-language films